Diogenes Rivas (born October 4, 1942) is a Venezuelan composer as well as a researcher of contemporary music. Additionally, he devotes time to teaching and the training of young composers. Rivas is the co-founder and artistic director of the Festival Atempo (Caracas) and artistic director (along with Pierre Strauch and Antonio Pileggi) of the Paris Nuit d'Atempo.

Biography 

Diogenes Rivas began to study music in the city of Mérida at the age of four with his father, Professor Jose Rafael Rivas, studying piano and oboe. Later on, in Caracas, his teachers were Moleiro Moses and Inocente Carreño (from 1954 to 1957). He continued his studies at the Academia Santa Cecilia in Rome, Italy, from 1958 to 1964. He also studied conducting with Sir John Barbirolli and Carlo Zecchi in Taormina, Italy and with Bruno Maderna in Salzburg, Austria (1968). He studied composition with Alfred Nieman in London from 1975 to 1977. A deep bond with Francisco Guerrero (in Madrid) led him to explore the constructivist technique of composition. Since 1980 he is dedicated exclusively to composing.

Rivas has received commissions from Radio France, the Fifth International Guitar Competition, the Ville d'Antony, France; Order, French Ministry of Culture, the Festival Presence, the Society of Authors and Composers SACEM of France, the Join 2E2M, the Ensemble Aleph and the Societe Francaise de Luth.

The Italian composer Antonio Pileggi describes the work of this artist as follows: "His music is an original synthesis of the great occidental traditions and of an association of techniques derived from specific mathematical and geometric structures. The result is an eclecticism that integrates diverse speculative disciplines and a musical creativity both unusual and seductive..."

In 2013, Rivas received the Ordre des Arts et des Lettres (Order of the Arts and Letters) by the French government.

Festival Atempo 

Since 1993, this Festival is dedicated to the international diffusion of outstanding contemporary repertory as well as that of traditional music from all periods of history. Atempo offers a space for the confrontation of thought as well as serious discourse from diverse points of view related to musical creation and interpretation. The Atempo Festival celebrated its 17th anniversary in July 2010 with an audience of more than 4,000 attending the three-day event. Throughout its uninterrupted history of nearly two decades, the Festival has presented 666 musical works of 320 different composers; 102 world premieres of works written especially for the Festival; 262 premieres for Venezuela, and 42 commissions, including 2 collective works in 191 concerts. Also, the festival has hosted 31 workshops on composition, dance, storytelling, poetry, painting and film; 47 musical lectures; 32 conferences; 1 opera; 4 dance venues; 15 poetry recitals; 9 plastic interventions (1 of design); 7 books published; 1 photo exhibition and a musical album commemorating the Festival's 15 anniversary.

The music of Diogenes Rivas 

The following is an extract form a letter the Italian maestro Antonio Pileggi wrote (in 2002) relating to Diogenes Rivas, his art and character:
For about twenty years, Maestro Diogenes Rivas has had a presence on the European and American musical scene. As a result, his work has become an important reference in the creative world. Yearly, his compositions are heard in the most important musical centers of the moment: Paris, London Zurich, Venice, New York Montreal, Cincinnati Caracas and others. Additionally, yearly performances of commissioned works are presented by the most prestigious musical institutions (Radio France, I'EIC, Aleph...) thus confirming his growing international recognition. The music of Maestro Rivas is a synthesis consisting of the major compositional elements of Western musical traditions and composing techniques provided in mathematical and geometrical structures (such as the number of mandala gold and structure). Indeed it is a syncretism that integrates the different disciplines as is the case in the "Quadrivium" of Greek and medieval culture in which music was integrated into mathematics, geometry and astronomy. This characteristic in Rivas is more about being Venezuela's temperament rather than its language. Nevertheless, this comparison is not enough to give us an understanding of the special touch that makes his world strange and seductive. Beyond the impeccable mastery of the orchestrations and the entire compositional practice, there is a wise and masterful modernity. In other words, not only has he the temerity to explore structure and language to its limits but also is able to produce an astonishing result of great musical coherence and original timbres without ever breaking the balance between abstraction and human perceptual ability.

In the contemporary music scene of recent years, the works of Maestro Rivas are in the forefront of living Latin American composers. He is considered the Venezuelan composer par excellence with great success representing his homeland of Venezuela, so rich in art and cultural personalities.

Nevertheless, in Europe and America we also recognize Rivas for his work as Artistic Director and the important pedagogic aspect developed by the Venezuelan and French Festival Atempo. At a moment when Europe was immersed in a certain crisis of ideas, this accomplishment has impressed European criticism because of its high standard and outstanding performers. In 17 years, (updated to 2010), the Festival Atempo has become an important global benchmark. In Europe, when speaking of Venezuela, the Festival Atempo is its immediate reference.

Rivas's work is achieving positive results for Venezuelan culture. Thanks to the Festival, Caracas has become a world center for musical creation. There is also an emerging generation of young composers – valuable Venezuelans – whose originality is appreciated for the first time during the course of each edition of the Festival.

Finally, I would like to highlight another of Rivas's great musical and artistic qualities referring to his human stature. Of great courage and love for culture, I wish to see him continue in his efforts to advance universal art.

Academic activities 

 1965–68; 1970–72 — Director of the School of Music, Universidad de Los Andes, Mérida-Venezuela
 1965–68 — Director of the Choir of the Universidad de Los Andes, Universidad de Los Andes, Mérida-Venezuela

Lectures 

University of San Diego, California, May 8, 2009. Conference "Ars Compositiva"
Conservatorio del Liceo de Barcelona (España), November 13, 2007. Lectures
University of Cincinnati. College-Conservatory de Music, April 15, 16, 17, 2002. Lectures
National Music Conservatory of Paris, November 2004. Lectures at the 
University of Houston, April 9, 2002. Conference 
Cité de la Musique, March 25, 2000. : "Técnicas y procedimientos de escritura para obras destinadas al violoncello"
Academia de Música de Basilea (Basel, Switzerland), December 2, 1997. Lecture
Festival Atempo Caracas, July 2001. : Reflection on the concept. Speakers: Diógenes Rivas, José Manuel Briceño Guerrero and Asdrúbal Colmenarez. Introducer: Valentina Marulanda
Festival Atempo Caracas, July 1999, : Reflection on the concept. Speakers: Diógenes Rivas, Luis Alberto Crespo and Rodolfo Izaguirre. Introducer: Alfredo Chacón
Festival Atempo Caracas, July 1998, : Reflection on the concept. Speakers: Domingo Miliani, Diógenes Rivas and Luis Alberto Crespo. Introducer: Stefania Mosca
Festival Atempo Caracas, July 1997, : Reflection on the musical work "Soberbio Orinoco". Speakers: Luis Alberto Crespo, Alfredo Chacón, Sergio Pitol and Diógenes Rivas. Introducer: Maruja Dagnino
Festival Atempo Caracas, July 1996, : Reflections on life and work of Antonin Artaud. Speakers: Diógenes Rivas, Alfredo Chacón and Perán Erminy. Introducer: Maruja Dagnino. Place: Centro Cultural Consolidado. Conference Auditorium.
Museo de Bellas Artes. Caracas, May 1996, Conference on the work of artist Victor Lucena. "Intervención en el Espacio"

Catalog of works (1975–2010)

References

Further reading

External links 
"Impromptu" by Diogenes Rivas played by Sophia Vaillant (piano) at Dailymotion

Diógenes Rivas interview on Radio France International
Review by Alfredo Rugeles on digital magazine Latinoamérica Música

Diogenes Rivas — Les oeuvres (SACEM)

Contemporary classical composers
1942 births
Living people
Venezuelan composers
Male composers
Venezuelan classical musicians
Accademia Nazionale di Santa Cecilia alumni